In competitive cycling, the kit (or uniform) is the standard equipment and attire worn specifically by athletes participating in the sport. The outfits differ from the clothes worn in other forms of cycling, such as commuting and recreational cycling (for which people are likely to wear ordinary street clothes, perhaps with a coat or  rain cape). Competitive kit uses technical and performance materials and features to improve efficiency and comfort. The UCI specify the kit and the design the riders use.

Cycling kits have evolved significantly since the early days of the sport when participants wore wool jerseys. Recent advances in manufacturing and technology have enabled lighter, more comfortable, colourful and complex designs to be made. Cycling kits nowadays are made primarily with synthetic materials, such as Lycra, which conforms to the body, thereby reducing drag by eliminating loose fabric as well as increase in comfort. Made-to-order custom kits with tailored cuts made to order are becoming increasingly common for individuals, clubs and teams to produce kits with custom designs. Notable brands include Adidas, Castelli, Pearl Izumi, Rapha and Santini SMS.

Cycling kits in professional races are usually featured with sponsor logos and advertising, and specific colours and/or patterns signify certain position or a leader in a race. In a race, cyclists pin number tags of the race on the back of the jersey (and another on the bike). To generate revenue for the professional teams, replica kits are generally made available for fans to purchase.

Equipment for the cyclist

Basic equipment 
The basic equipment set out in the UCI technical regulation guide (Section 3: riders’ clothing) includes a jersey with sleeves, a pair of shorts and possibly a skinsuit.

Generally speaking, the typical summer cycling kit (whether racing or not) consists of:

 Helmet: head protection in case of a fall
 Cycling jersey: covering the torso
 Bib shorts or shorts  for the lower half of the body and often includes pads for added comfort
 Skinsuit, an alternative one-piece combining the jersey and shorts commonly used in time trials
 Socks, typically medium length
 Cycling shoes: specialised shoes with stiff soles for efficient power transfer with cleats: to attach to the pedals

and in spring/autumn the additional pieces:

 Gilet: often thin and packable in the back pocket for colder or windy days
 Arm warmers: sleeves that can be worn separately
 Leg warmers: similar to leggings offering additional warmth
 Baselayer: worn beneath the jersey and the straps of the bib shorts for additional warmth

and in winter the additional pieces:

 Head warmer or cap: added protection from wind and rain, which may also cover the ears
 Neck warmer: protection for the neck, instead of a scarf (that may fall off)
 Jacket: jackets can be thin or insulated, windproof and/or waterproof for chilly days
 Bib tights instead of bib shorts and leg warmers: insulated/lined, full length versions of the bib shorts
 Booties (overshoes): neoprene or rubber shoe covers that keeps the shoes dry by preventing water ingress from sprays and/or rain

Accessories 
The following optional pieces can be worn by the cyclist for additional comfort or performance monitoring:

 Sunglasses or transparent glasses for darker days
 Heart rate monitor: which can be connected to and displayed on an activity tracker or a smartphone
 Gloves/mitts: offering additional grip and comfort and generally half finger in summer, full finger and/or insulated for winter

Gallery

See also
Cycling in general
 Cycling
Cycling as a sport
 Road bicycle racing
 Road cycling
Exercise clothing and fabrics
 Exercise dress
 Performance fabrics
 Spandex
 Sportswear

References 

 
Cycling jerseys
Clothing_by_function
Sportswear